The third season of the Brazilian competitive reality television series MasterChef Profissionais premiered on August 21 at 10:30 p.m. on Band.

Chef Rafael Gomes won the competition over chef Willian Peters on December 11, 2018.

Contestants

Top 14

Elimination table

Key

Ratings and reception

Brazilian ratings
All numbers are in points and provided by Kantar Ibope Media.

 In 2018, each point represents 248.647 households in 15 market cities in Brazil (71.855 households in São Paulo)

References

External links
 MasterChef Profissionais on Band

2018 Brazilian television seasons
MasterChef (Brazilian TV series)